Vaka Manupuna (born June 30, 1982) is an American football defensive tackle. He was signed by the Washington Redskins as an undrafted free agent in 2006. He played college football at Colorado.

Manupuna was also a member of the New York Jets and Utah Blaze.

Early years
As a senior, Manupuna earned first-team all-state honors from both the Honolulu Advertiser and Star-Bulletin for St. Louis School in Honolulu, Hawaii.  SuperPrep named him to its All-Far West team, ranked as the No. 72 player overall in the region, and he also earned first-team all-Interscholastic League of Honolulu (ILH) honors for a second straight year.  As a senior, he registered 37 solo tackles (about 60 overall), with four fumble recoveries, three forced fumbles and three quarterback sacks.

College career
Manupuna played college football at the University of Colorado and started in all 13 games as a senior, including the Champs Sports Bowl.  He enjoyed his best season as a senior where he earned honorable mention All-Big 12 Conference honors from both the Associated Press and the league coaches.  Manupuna had 52 total tackles on his senior season (28 solo), including four for losses, five third down stops, seven quarterback hurries, two fumble recoveries and two pass breakups.

Professional career

First stint with Redskins
Manupuna was signed by the Washington Redskins of the National Football League as a free agent in 2006 and spent part of the season on the practice squad.

New York Jets
Manupuna was signed to the practice squad of the New York Jets on December 20, 2006, only to be released on December 27.

Second stint with Redskins
Manupuna was re-signed to a future contract by the Washington Redskins. He was released on May 15, re-signed on August 2 and released again on August 13.

Utah Blaze
Manupuna played for the Utah Blaze of the Arena Football League in 2008, recording 16 tackles and 2.5 sacks.

Third stint with Redskins
Manupuna was re-signed by the Washington Redskins on May 1, 2009. He was waived on August 4, 2009.

Spokane Shock
Manupuna signed with the Spokane Shock of the newly reformed Arena Football League.

Rugby League 

He has been named in the United States national rugby league team 22 man squad for the 2010 Atlantic Cup.

References

External links
Arena football bio
Colorado Buffaloes bio
Washington Redskins bio

1982 births
Living people
Players of American football from Honolulu
American people of Tongan descent
American football defensive tackles
Washington Redskins players
New York Jets players
Utah Blaze players
American rugby league players
United States national rugby league team players
Maui Rugby players
Colorado Buffaloes football players